The Men's Tournament of the 2016 FIBA 3x3 Under-18 World Championships hosted in Kazakhstan was contested by 20 teams.

Participating teams
All five FIBA zones were represented. The top 20 teams, including the hosts, based on the FIBA National Federation ranking qualified for the tournament.

FIBA Asia (5)
  (7)
 (6)
 (19) (hosts)
 (13)
 (14)
FIBA Africa (1)
 (17)
FIBA Oceania (1)
 (12)

FIBA Americas (3)
 (15)
 (5)
 (8)

FIBA Europe (10)
 (10)
 (16)
 (18)
 (4)
 (11)
 (1)
 (3)
 (9)
 (20)
 (2)

Main tournament

Preliminary round

Group A

|

|

|}

Group B

|

|

|}

Group C

|

|

|}

Group D

|

|

|}

Knock out Stage

References

External links
Official website

Men